A Not So Merry Christmas (Spanish: Reviviendo la Navidad) is a 2022 Mexican Christmas fantasy comedy film directed by Mark Alazraki and written by Alazraki, Juan Carlos Garzón & Angélica Gudiño. Starring Mauricio Ochmann. It is a remake of the 2020 Brazilian film Just Another Christmas. It premiered worldwide on December 20, 2022 on Netflix

Synopsis 
Chuy, a very grumpy man, one day life offers him a great lesson: he receives a spell at Christmas and wakes up a year later. He soon realizes that he is condemned to repeat Christmas Eve over and over again, to deal with the consequences of what his other self has done in the remaining 364 days of the year.

Cast 
The actors participating in this film are:

 Mauricio Ochmann as Chuy
 Ana Brenda Contreras as Daniela
 Manu Na as Diva madrina
 José Sefami as Néstor
 Paula Espinoza as Young Paola
 Romina Poza as Teen Paola
 Bastian Calva as Óscar
 Verónica Bravo as Alejandra
 Alfonso Borbolla as Conrado
 Aldo Escalante as Rubén
 Hernán Del Riego as Uncle Migue
 Andrew Ortega as Nuria
 Lucero Trejo as Aunt Majo
 Emilio Echevarría as Roberta

Production 
The filming lasted 6 weeks in total, it was filmed in Mexico City at Galerías Insurgentes, located in Colonia del Valle.

References

External links 

 

2022 films
2022 fantasy films
2022 comedy films
Mexican Christmas films
Mexican fantasy comedy films
2020s Spanish-language films
2020s Mexican films
Films set in Mexico
Films shot in Mexico City
Films shot in Mexico
Films about families
Spanish-language Netflix original films
Remakes of Brazilian films
Time loop films